The Aegean chub (Squalius fellowesii) is a species of freshwater fish in the family Cyprinidae. The species is found in the Madra south to Esen River in Turkey.

References

Fish described in 1868
Taxa named by Albert Günther
Squalius